Maireana trichoptera is a plant in the Amaranthaceae family, native to all mainland states and territories of Australia except Queensland.

It was first described as Kochia excavata var. trichoptera by John McConnell Black in 1923, but was transferred to the genus, Maireana in 1975 by Paul Graham Wilson.

References

External links
Maireana trichoptera: images & occurrence data from GBIF

Taxa named by John McConnell Black
Plants described in 1923
Flora of the Northern Territory
Flora of South Australia
Flora of Western Australia
Flora of New South Wales
Flora of Victoria (Australia)
trichoptera